Patagonian fox may refer to:

Culpeo
South American gray fox

Animal common name disambiguation pages